Ambassadors of the United States are persons nominated by the president to serve as the country's diplomatic representatives to foreign nations, international organizations, and as ambassadors-at-large. Under Article II, Section 2 of the U.S. Constitution, their appointment must be confirmed by the United States Senate; while an ambassador may be appointed during a recess, they can serve only until the end of the next session of Congress, unless subsequently confirmed.

Ambassadors are the highest-ranking diplomats of the U.S. and are usually based at the embassy in the host country. They are under the jurisdiction of the Department of State and answer directly to the secretary of state; however, ambassadors serve "at the pleasure of the President", meaning they can be dismissed at any time. Appointments change regularly for various reasons, such as reassignment or retirement.

An ambassador may be a career Foreign Service Officer (career diplomatCD) or a political appointee (PA). In most cases, career foreign service officers serve a tour of approximately three years per ambassadorship, whereas political appointees customarily tender their resignations upon the inauguration of a new president.

The State Department provides lists of ambassadors that are updated periodically; the most recent listing was published November 1, 2021. A listing by country of past chiefs of mission is maintained by the Office of the Historian of the U.S. Department of State, along with the names and appointment dates of past and present ambassadors-at-large and mission to international organizations.

Current U.S. ambassadors
Note that the information in this list is subject to change due to regular personnel changes resulting from retirements and reassignments. The State Department posts updated lists of ambassadors approximately monthly, accessible via an interactive menu-based website.<ref name="StateDept1"

Ambassadors to International Organizations

Ambassadors to the United Nations
Current ambassadors from the United States to International Organization of the United Nations:

Other international Organizations
Current ambassadors from the United States to other international organizations:

Ambassadors-at-large
Current ambassadors-at-large from the United States with worldwide responsibility:

Other chiefs of mission
Senior diplomatic representatives of the United States hosted in posts other than embassies. Unlike other consulates, these persons report directly to the Secretary of State.

Special envoys, representatives, and coordinators
These diplomatic officials report directly to the Secretary of State. Many oversee a portfolio not restricted to one nation, often an overall goal, and are not usually subject to Senate confirmation. Unlike the State Department offices and diplomats listed in other sections of this Article, the offices and special envoys/representatives/coordinators listed in this Section are created and staffed by direction of top Federal Executive administratorsprimarily U.S. Presidents and Secretaries of Statewhose political or organizational management philosophies may not be shared by their successors. As such, many of these positions may go unfilled upon assumption of office by successor Presidential Administrations, with their offices sometimes merged with or subsumed into other offices, or abolished altogether.

Nations without exchange of ambassadors
 Bhutan: According to the U.S. State Department, "The United States and the Kingdom of Bhutan have not established formal diplomatic relations; however, the two governments have informal and cordial relations." Informal contact with the nation of Bhutan is maintained through the U.S. Embassy in New Delhi.
 Iran: On April 7, 1980, the United States broke diplomatic relations with Iran after the 1979 Iranian Revolution. On April 24, 1981, the Swiss government assumed representation of U.S. interests in Tehran, and Algeria assumed representation of Iranian interests in the United States. Currently, Iranian interests in the United States are represented by the government of Pakistan. The U.S. Department of State named Iran a "State Sponsor of Terrorism" on January 19, 1984.
 North Korea: The Democratic People's Republic of Korea is not on friendly terms with the United States, and while talks between the two countries are ongoing, there is no exchange of ambassadors. Sweden functions as Protective Power for the United States in Pyongyang and performs limited consular responsibilities for U.S. citizens in North Korea.
 Taiwan: With the normalization of relations with the People's Republic of China in 1979, the United States has not maintained official diplomatic relations with Taiwan. Relations between Taiwan and the United States are maintained through an unofficial instrumentality, the Taipei Economic and Cultural Representative Office, with headquarters in Taipei and field offices in Washington, D.C., and twelve other U.S. cities. The Taipei Office of the American Institute in Taiwan, a non-profit, public corporation, functions as a de facto embassy, performing most consular functions and staffed by Foreign Service Officers who are formally "on leave".

Notable past ambassadors
Many well-known individuals have served the United States as ambassadors, or in formerly analogous positions such as envoy, including several who also became President of the United States (indicated in boldface below). Some notable ambassadors have included:

Ambassadors killed in office
Eight United States Ambassadors have been killed in officesix of them by armed attack and the other two in plane crashes.

Ambassadors to past countries
 Czechoslovakia
 East Germany
 Hawaii
 Prussia
 North Yemen
 South Vietnam
 South Yemen
 Texas
 Yugoslavia

See also

 Chief of Protocol of the United States
 List of ambassadors to the United States
 List of LGBT ambassadors of the United States
 List of female ambassadors of the United States
 List of ambassadors appointed by Donald Trump
 List of ambassadors appointed by Joe Biden
 United States Foreign Service Career Ambassador

Notes and references

External links

 Websites of U.S. Embassies and Consulates
 Principal Officers and Chiefs of Mission

 
 
United States Department of State
 
United States